{{safesubst:#invoke:RfD||2=Jesus as Christ and Messiah|month = February
|day = 25
|year = 2023
|time = 12:51
|timestamp = 20230225125159

|content=
REDIRECT Jesus in Christianity

}}